Noah Watts (born December 29, 1983) is a Native American actor and musician, a member of the Crow tribe, and a descendant of the Blackfeet Nation. He bears the Crow name Bulaagawish, which means "Old Bull".

Biography

Noah Watts is a descendant of the Blackfeet Nation. He was born in Livingston, Montana, and grew up in Bozeman, Montana.

At the age of 17, while a senior in high school, Noah's first professional audition landed him a role in the film The Slaughter Rule. After filming for The Slaughter Rule was complete, he took three weeks off from school to act in the Chris Eyre film Skins. He graduated Bozeman High School in May 2001 and soon won a scholarship to attend the American Academy of Dramatic Arts in Los Angeles.

During his first semester at AADA, Noah was offered a part in a Chris Eyre film titled Skinwalkers as a teenage gang-leader and suspected murderer—a role far different from the shy, devoted son he played in Skins.

In the Southwest Repertory Company's production of the play "The Indolent Boys", written by N. Scott Momaday, Noah played the role of a young Native man in a boarding school in the 1800s, who was being trained to be a Christian missionary, but is conflicted between his Native culture and the Christian religion inculcated.

In the spring of 2005, Watts was cast in Native Voices at the Autry's Native American adaptation of William Shakespeare's Romeo and Juliet entitled Kino and Teresa, written by James Lujan (Taos Pueblo), where he played the villain Eladio (an adaption of Tybalt). Noah also took part in an independent film entitled The Last Beyond as Joe Running Elk, a young man in the Great Depression who began a life of adventure outside the law after losing his job working on the railroad.

Native Voices at the Autry cast Noah as the lead character  in "Salvage" written by Diane Glancy (Cherokee) and directed by Sheila Tousey (Menominee, Stockbridge Munsee) in 2008. The play, set in Browning Montana, was remounted in 2009 for Borderlands Origins Festival in London England at The Riverside Studios.

In 2012 Watts performed his first major voice acting role as Ratonhnaké:ton (or Connor), the protagonist of Assassin's Creed III, for whom he also provided motion capture and facial animation. He reprised the role as a supporting character in Assassin's Creed III: Liberation, also in 2012, as well as a cameo appearance in a DLC chapter for 2013's Assassin's Creed IV: Black Flag.

Filmography

Films
The Slaughter Rule (2002) - Waylon Walks Alone
Skins (2002) - Herbie Yellow Lodge
Skinwalkers (2002) (TV movie) - Ruben Maze
The Last Beyond (2019) - Joe Running Elk

TV Series
Sons of Anarchy (2009) - Ferdinand
Big Love (2010) - Croupier
The Glades (2010) - Billy
CSI: Miami (2011) - Cesar Soto
Ringer (2011-2012) - Daniel Eknath

Video game
Red Dead Redemption (2010) - The Local Population
Assassin's Creed III (2012) - Ratonhnaké:ton (Connor)
Assassin's Creed III: Liberation (2012) - Ratonhnaké:ton (Connor)
Assassin's Creed III: The Tyranny of King Washington (2013) - Ratonhnaké:ton (Connor)
Assassin's Creed IV: Black Flag (2013) -  Ratonhnaké:ton (Connor)

Stage Acting
The Indolent Boys (2002) - John Pai
Kino and Teresa (2005) - Eladio
Salvage (2008, 2009) - Wolf

References

External links

http://soundcloud.com/nickels-bones

Native American male actors
Living people
American male video game actors
Crow people
1983 births
People from Livingston, Montana
Blackfoot people